Sverre Arnljot Breste Kjeldstadli (14 February 1916 – 28 March 1961) was a Norwegian historian.

During World War II he was a courier for Milorg. His dr.philos. thesis from 1959, Hjemmestyrkene. Hovedtrekk av den militære motstanden under okkupasjonen, has been an inspiration for later works by other historians.

He was a son of trade unionist Lars Kjeldstadli (1870–1934) and his wife Beate, (born Lotsberg, (1880–1965). He was a son-in-law of Daniel Grini, and together with Ellen Helvig Grini (1918–2001) he had the son, historian Knut Kjeldstadli. He died in March 1961 and was buried in Ullern.

References

1916 births
1961 deaths
Norwegian resistance members
20th-century Norwegian historians